Erik Wilhelm "Erkka" Wilén (15 July 1898 – 23 July 1982) was a Finnish sprinter. He competed at the 1920, 1924 and 1928 Summer Olympics in the 400 m and 400 m hurdles events and won a silver medal in the 400 m hurdles in 1924. He failed to reach the finals in all his other events.

References

External links 
 

1898 births
1982 deaths
Athletes from Helsinki
Finnish male hurdlers
Olympic silver medalists for Finland
Athletes (track and field) at the 1920 Summer Olympics
Athletes (track and field) at the 1924 Summer Olympics
Athletes (track and field) at the 1928 Summer Olympics
Olympic athletes of Finland
Medalists at the 1924 Summer Olympics
Finnish male sprinters
Olympic silver medalists in athletics (track and field)